Pseudomuriella is a genus of green algae, specifically of the class Chlorophyceae.

References

External links

Scientific references

Scientific databases

 AlgaeBase
 AlgaTerra database
 Index Nominum Genericorum

Sphaeropleales genera
Sphaeropleales